The tripletail wrasse (Cheilinus trilobatus) is a species of marine ray-finned fish from the family Labridae, the wrasses.

Description 
It has a moderately deep body with a tri-lobed tail. Its body is green to brown with molted purple and red markings.there are 4 vertical dark stripes on its body. Its head has red spots and red lines radiating from its eye.

Habitat  

Diet 
It eats shelled benthic invertebrates such as mollusks and crustaceans, but sometimes fish.

References

External links
http://www.fishbase.org/summary/Cheilinus-trilobatus.html
 

Tripletail wrasse
Fish of Thailand
Fish described in 1801